Bojja Venkata Reddy is an Indian politician. He was elected to the Lok Sabha, the lower house of the Parliament of India from the Nandyal  in Andhra Pradesh  as a member of the Indian National Congress. Prior to this Sri Bojja Venkata Reddy was elected to Andhra Pradesh state legislative assembly in 1972, 1978,he was very instrumental in bringing P.V.Narasimha Rao to Nandyal and making him contest for member of Parliament when P.V.Narasimha was in office as Prime Minister of India, later Bojja Venkata Reddy become the National Seeds Corporation Chairman from 1993 to 1997

References

External links
Official biographical sketch in Parliament of India website

1932 births
Living people
Lok Sabha members from Andhra Pradesh
Indian National Congress politicians
India MPs 1989–1991